Lleida may be:

Lleida, a city in the west of Catalonia, Spain.
Lleida (province), a province of Catalonia, Spain.
UE Lleida, a football club based in Lleida, Catalonia.
CE Lleida Bàsquet, a basketball club based in Lleida, Catalonia.